TVM was a Dutch road bicycle racing team. It folded in 2000, two years after suffering a doping scandal. Farm Frites continued as a sponsor in 2001 with the new team, .

Major wins

1988
Brabantse Pijl, Johan Capiot
1989
Brabantse Pijl, Johan Capiot
Stage 17 Giro d'Italia, Phil Anderson
1990
Omloop Het Volk, Johan Capiot
Stage 4b Giro d'Italia, Phil Anderson
1992
Omloop Het Volk, Johan Capiot
Nokere Koerse, Johan Capiot
Brabantse Pijl, Johan Capiot
Stage 3 Tour de France, Rob Harmeling,
1993
Stage 15 Vuelta a España, Dag Otto Lauritzen
Stage 5 Tour de France, Jesper Skibby
1994
Clásica de Almería, Johan Capiot
Stage 4 Tirreno–Adriatico, Jesper Skibby
Stage 17 Vuelta a España, Bart Voskamp
Stage 8 Tour de France, Bo Hamburger
1995
Stage 6 Tour de France, Jeroen Blijlevens
Stage 9 Vuelta a España, Jesper Skibby
Stage 10 Vuelta a España, Jeroen Blijlevens
1996
Dwars Door Vlaanderen, Tristan Hoffman
Stage 6 Tour de France, Jeroen Blijlevens
Stage 19 Tour de France, Bart Voskamp
Stage 5 Vuelta a España, Jeroen Blijlevens
1997
Omloop Het Volk, Peter Van Petegem
Stage 7 Tour de France, Jeroen Blijlevens
Stage 1 Vuelta a España, Lars Michaelsen
Stage 8 Vuelta a España, Bart Voskamp
1998
Omloop Het Volk, Peter Van Petegem
Scheldeprijs, Servais Knaven
Stage 12 Giro d'Italia, Laurent Roux
Stage 5 Tour de France, Jeroen Blijlevens
Stages 2 & 5 Vuelta a España, Jeroen Blijlevens
1999
Nokere Koerse, Jeroen Blijlevens
Stage 7 Tirreno–Adriatico, Steven de Jongh
E3 Prijs Vlaanderen, Peter Van Petegem
Tour of Flanders, Peter Van Petegem
Scheldeprijs, Jeroen Blijlevens
Stages 3 & 7 Giro d´Italia, Jeroen Blijlevens
Stage 10 Vuelta a España, Serhiy Utchakov
Stage 21 Vuelta a España, Jeroen Blijlevens
2000
Stage 1 Tour Down Under, Koos Moerenhout
Stage 6 Tour Down Under, Robbie McEwen
E3 Prijs Vlaanderen, Serguei Ivanov
Gent–Wevelgem, Geert Van Bondt
Stage 3 Post Danmark Rundt, Geert Van Bondt
Stage 2 Vuelta a España, Jans Koerts
Grote Prijs Jef Scherens - Leuven, Dave Bruylandts
Grand Prix d'Isbergues, Peter Van Petegem

Notable riders

Defunct cycling teams based in the Netherlands
Cycling teams based in the Netherlands
Cycling teams established in 1988
Cycling teams disestablished in 2000